Alan Silva & the Sound Visions Orchestra is a live album by multi-instrumentalist Alan Silva. It was recorded in May 1999 at St. Nicholas of Myra Church in New York City during the annual Vision Festival, and was released in 2001 by Eremite Records. On the album, Silva is joined by a large ensemble known as the Sound Visions Orchestra.

Reception

In a review for AllMusic, Steve Loewy wrote: "Silva gathered some of the cream of the East Coast avant-garde for this huge production... The results are loud, brash, brassy, and violent, pulverizing with squalls of power... All three parts of the composition are laced with plenty of solos, which explode with giddiness... This is a majestic and magnificent recording, and if it is difficult to listen to at one setting, it is nonetheless worth the effort."

The authors of the Penguin Guide to Jazz Recordings stated: "the recording quality simply isn't good enough to handle such a complex entity, and some absorbing solos and ensemble passages get lost in the mix."

Derek Taylor, writing for All About Jazz, commented: "The sheer magnitude of the instrumental arsenal at Silva's disposal makes for some unbelievably dense collective dissonance and the undulating unified sound fills the audio space in gargantuan gusts... With the Visions Orchestra Silva has accomplished a rare feat in creative improvised music, a sustainable large-piece ensemble that makes full and impressive use of both its girth and diversity."

In an article for Paris Transatlantic, Dan Warburton wrote: "when [Silva's] 23-piece Sound Visions Orchestra is in full flight, we might as well be back in the glory days of the Celestrial Communication Orchestra...  Silva, like nobody else I can think of except perhaps Cecil Taylor, knows just how to set ensembles on fire... Play this mother loud and let these guys throw their sound against your walls."

Track listing
Composed by Alan Silva.

 "I" – 21:26
 "II" – 17:56
 "III" – 13:14

Personnel
 Alan Silva – synthesizer, conductor
 Elliot Levin – piccolo, flute, soprano saxophone
 William Connell Jr. – bass clarinet, flute
 Karen Borca – bassoon
 Ori Kaplan – alto saxophone
 Rob Brown – alto saxophone
 Sabir Mateen – tenor saxophone, clarinet, flute
 Andrew Lamb – tenor saxophone
 Edward "Kidd" Jordan – tenor saxophone
 Scott Currie – baritone saxophone
 J. D. Parran – bass saxophone, alto clarinet
 Raphe Malik – trumpet
 Stephen Haynes – trumpet, brass
 Taylor Ho Bynum – trumpet, brass
 Roy Campbell Jr. – trumpet, flugelhorn
 Art Baron – trombone
 Steve Swell – trombone
 Bill Lowe – bass trombone, tuba
 Mark Taylor – French horn
 Joseph Daley – tuba
 Mark Hennen – piano
 Wilber Morris – bass
 Jackson Krall – drums
 Steve Dalachinsky – voice (poet)

References

2001 live albums
Alan Silva live albums
Eremite Records live albums
Live free jazz albums